Hemidactylus coalescens is a species of geckos belonging to the family Gekkonidae. It occurs in Central Africa.

Distribution and habitat 
This species is locally common in rainforest regions of Central Africa, from southern Cameroon through Gabon to the Republic of the Congo.

Description
These medium-sized species has a more elongated head and three enlarged internasal scales. Body shows a few dark crossbands with white spots and pale brown interspaces with white spots. The first crossband is restricted to the neck. On the sides of the brown head there is a fine narrow dark stripe  reaching the eyes.

References

Further reading
Mboumba, Jean-François. "A new lizard species for Gabon, Ichnotropis bivittata Bocage, 1866 (Squamata, Lacertidae)."
Leaché, Adam D., et al. "Species delimitation using genome-wide SNP data." Systematic Biology 63.4 (2014): 534–542.

External links

Hemidactylus
Geckos of Africa
Reptiles of Cameroon
Reptiles of Gabon
Reptiles of the Republic of the Congo
Reptiles described in 2014
Taxa named by Philipp Wagner